Shirin Su Rural District may refer to:
 Shirin Su Rural District (Hamadan Province)
 Shirin Su Rural District (North Khorasan Province)